Fibrinolysis syndrome  is characterized by an acute hemorrhagic state brought about by inability of the blood to clot, with massive hemorrhages into the skin producing blackish, purplish swellings and sloughing.

Symptoms 
Hemorrhages (this includes severe bleeding of any particular area. Be it: nasal, rectal, oral, it also includes bleeding from scrapes, cuts, bruises (big bruises that do not disappear in the first two to three days).

Cause 
The cause for Fibrinolysis syndrome, is the inability of the body to produce blood-coagulates to stop bleeding. What causes the body to not produce blood-coagulates are the low levels of fibrin, or therefore non-existent fibrin.

Diagnosis

Treatment

See also 
 Skin lesion
 Hemorrhage
 Fibrin

References 

Vascular-related cutaneous conditions
Syndromes